Black Rock is an extinct community located in Warren Township in Warren County, Indiana, near the border with Tippecanoe County.  The site, which is still listed as a populated place by the USGS, is mostly forested and is part of the Black Rock Nature Preserve administered by NICHES Land Trust.

Geography 
Black Rock is located at  along Warren County Road 350 North. The site occupies a prominent outcropping of Mansfield sandstone that overlooks the Wabash River.

References

External links 
 Black Rock Nature Preserve

Former populated places in Warren County, Indiana
Ghost towns in Indiana